Ode Ogede (often O. S. Ogede, Ode S. Ogede) is a Nigerian-born American academic who is professor of African literature at North Carolina Central University and was a lecturer at Ahmadu Bello University.

Publications

Ode Ogede, Art, Society, and Performance: Igede Praise Poetry (University Press of Florida, 1997)
Ode Ogede, Ayi Kwei Armah, Radical Iconoclast (Heinemann, 1999)
Ode Ogede, Achebe and the Politics of Representation (Africa WP, 2000)
Ode Ogede, Ogede, Ode. Teacher Commentary on Student Papers Conventions, Beliefs, and Practices.  Westport, Conn: Bergin & Garvey, 200  In 702 libraries according to  WorldCat(Garvin, 2001)
Ode Ogede, Achebe's Things Fall Apart: Reader's Guide (Continuum, 2007)
Ode Ogede, Helping Students Write Successful papers (Lang, 2013)
Intertextuality in Contemporary African Literature (Rowman, 2011)
Chiji Akoma, Research in African Literatures 30 #4 (1999): 227-28
Adekoo Adeleke, Research in African Literatures 42 # 2 (2011): 102-104
Tanure Ojaide, World Literature Today 73.1 (1999): 199
 
Contemporary Authors (Gale/Cengage Press 2007)

References

1956 births
Living people
North Carolina Central University faculty
Academic staff of Ahmadu Bello University
Scholars of African literature